Dan Maraya Jos (also known as Adamu Danmaraya Jos; born Adamu Wayya in 1946 – 20 June 2015) was a Nigerian Hausa griot best known for playing the kontigi.

Life 
Dan Maraya Jos, whose name means "The Orphan of Jos", was born in 1946 in Bukuru, near Jos in Plateau State, Nigeria. His birth name is Adamu Wayya, but his father died shortly after his birth and his mother died while he was still an infant, hence the name by which everyone knows him. Dan Maraya's father was a court musician for the Sarkin Hausawa of Bukuru, who took Dan Maraya under his care when his parents died. Dan Maraya showed an early interest in music and came under the influence of local professional musicians. During a trip to Maiduguri while he was still a pre-teen, he was impressed by musicians some playing with the Kuntigi instrument, upon his return to Jos, he made a kuntigi, with which he has accompanied himself ever since.

The kuntigi is a small, single-stringed lute. The body is usually a large, oval-shaped sardine can covered with goatskin. Dan Maraya and other kuntigi players are solo performers who accompany themselves with a rapid ostinato on the kuntigi. During instrumental interludes they repeat a fixed pattern for the song they are playing, but while singing, they will often change the notes of the pattern to parallel the melody they are singing.

Like most professional musicians, the mainstay of Dan Maraya's repertoire is praise singing, but Dan Maraya singles out his personal heroes rather than the rich and famous. His first, and perhaps still his most famous song is "Wak'ar Karen Mota" ["Song of the Driver's Mate"] in praise of the young men who get passengers in and out of minivan buses and do the dirty work of changing tires, pushing broken-down vans, and the like. During the Nigerian Civil War, he composed numerous songs in praise of soldiers of the federal army and incorporated vivid accounts of scenes from the war in his songs.

When the civil war ended with the victory of the federal government, Dan Maraya sang "Munafukan Yaki..." ("The Hypocrites of War") lampooning governments and international figures that sided with Biafra. Many of his songs incorporate social commentary. These include the songs on marriage, which probably date from the early 1970s. One might argue that they are really one large song, and in performance, Dan Maraya incorporates lines from each of them. However, the recordings that serve as the basis for this study have three distinct musical settings, and the songs themselves have three different themes: "Jawabin Aure" ["Discourse on Marriage"] lists the problems attendant in divorce and admonishes married couples to try to patch up their differences. "Auren Dole" ["Forced Marriage"] decries the practice of families arranging marriages for their daughters rather than letting them decide on their own mates. "Gulma-Wuya" ["The Busybody"] describes a neighborhood gossip who works in collusion with a boka (a practitioner in casting spells, removing evil spirits, etc.) to disrupt marriages by sowing dissension between women and their husbands. The latter song is amusing in that Dan Maraya performs it as a drama, imitating the voices of the different characters as they speak, a technique that he has used in other songs as well.

References

Musicians from Jos
Nigerian male musicians
1946 births
2015 deaths
Date of birth missing
Place of birth missing